In Western art history, mise en abyme (also mise en abîme) is a formal technique of placing a copy of an image within itself, often in a way that suggests an infinitely recurring sequence. In film theory and literary theory, it refers to the technique of inserting a story within a story. The term is derived from heraldry and literally means "placed into abyss". It was first appropriated for modern criticism by the French author André Gide.

A common sense of the phrase is the visual experience of standing between two mirrors, seeing as a result an infinite reproduction of one's image. Another is the Droste effect, in which a picture appears within itself, in a place where a similar picture would realistically be expected to appear. That is named after the 1904 Droste cocoa package, which depicts a woman holding a tray bearing a Droste cocoa package, which bears a smaller version of her image.

Heraldry

In the terminology of heraldry, the abyme or abisme is the center of a coat of arms. The term mise en abyme (also called inescutcheon) then meant “put/placed in the center”. It described a coat of arms that appears as a smaller shield in the center of a larger one (see Droste effect).

A complex example of mise en abyme is seen in the coat of arms of the United Kingdom for the period 1816–1837, as used by King George III. The crown of Charlemagne is placed en abyme within the escutcheon of Hanover, which in turn is en abyme within the arms of England, Scotland, and Ireland.

Medieval examples

While art historians working on the early-modern period adopted this phrase and interpreted it as showing artistic "self awareness", medievalists tended not to use it. Many examples, however, can be found in the pre-modern era, as in a mosaic from the Hagia Sophia dated to the year 944. To the left, Justinian I offers the Virgin Mary the Hagia Sophia, which contains the mosaic itself. To the right, Constantine I offers the city of Constantinople (now known as Istanbul), which itself contains the Hagia Sophia.

More medieval examples can be found in the collection of articles Medieval mise-en-abyme: the object depicted within itself, in which Jersey Ellis conjectures that the self-references sometimes are used to strengthen the symbolism of gift-giving by documenting the act of giving on the object itself. An example of this self-referential gift-giving appears in the Stefaneschi Triptych in the Vatican Museum, which features Cardinal Giacomo Gaetani Stefaneschi as the giver of the altarpiece.

Critical theory and art history
In Western art history, mise en abyme is a formal technique in which an image contains a smaller copy of itself, in a sequence appearing to recur infinitely; "recursion" is another term for this. The modern meaning of the phrase originates with the author André Gide who used it to describe self-reflexive embeddings in various art forms and to describe what he sought in his own work. As examples, Gide cites both paintings such as Las Meninas by Diego Velázquez and literary forms such as William Shakespeare's use of the "play within a play" device in Hamlet, where a theatrical company presents a performance for the characters that illuminates a thematic aspect of the play itself. This use of the phrase mise en abyme was picked up by scholars and popularized in the 1977 book Le récit spéculaire. Essai sur la mise en abyme by Lucien Dällenbach.

Literature and film

Mise en abyme occurs in a text when there is a reduplication of images or concepts referring to the textual whole. Mise en abyme is a play of signifiers within a text, of sub-texts mirroring each other. This mirroring can attain a level where meaning may become unstable and, in this respect, may be seen as part of the process of deconstruction. The film-within-a-film, where a film contains a plot about the making of a movie, is an example of mise en abyme. The film being made within the film refers, through its mise en scène, to the real film being made. The spectator sees film equipment, stars getting ready for the take, crew sorting out the various directorial needs. The narrative of the film within the film may directly reflect the one in the real film. An example is La Nuit américaine (1973) by François Truffaut.

In film, the meaning of mise en abyme is similar to the artistic definition, but also includes the idea of a "dream within a dream". For example, a character awakens from a dream and later discovers that they are still dreaming. Activities similar to dreaming, such as unconsciousness and virtual reality, also are described as mise en abyme. This is seen in the film eXistenZ where the two protagonists never truly know whether or not they are out of the game. It also becomes a prominent element of Charlie Kaufman's Synecdoche, New York (2008). More recent instances can be found in the films Inland Empire (2007) and Inception (2010).  Classic filmic examples include the snow globe in Citizen Kane (1941) which provides a clue to the film's core mystery, and the discussion of Edgar Allan Poe's written works (particularly "The Purloined Letter") in the Jean-Luc Godard film Band of Outsiders (1964).

In literary criticism, mise en abyme is a type of frame story, in which the core narrative may be used to illuminate some aspect of the framing story. The term is used in deconstruction and deconstructive literary criticism as a paradigm of the intertextual nature of language, that is, of the way language never quite reaches the foundation of reality because it refers in a frame-within-a-frame way, to other language, which refers to other language, and so forth.

In comedy, Mise en abyme can be seen with The Harold, an improvisation cycle with reoccurring themes, popularized by Del Close in his book "Truth in Comedy."

See also

References

Artistic techniques
Metafictional techniques
Heraldry
Art history
Composition in visual art